MS Santa Regina is a roll-on/roll-off ferry that was in service for Strait Shipping Ltd in New Zealand. The ferry was built for overnight services between Marseille and Corsica in the Mediterranean Sea. Santa Regina was the flagship vessel for the Bluebridge ferry service, which runs from Wellington to Picton up to four times a day. Bluebridge competes with the longer running Interislander line, which also provides transport across Cook Strait.

Santa Regina was renamed Nusa Putera and provides a ferry service to the Port of Merak in Indonesia.

References

External links
 Strait Shipping - Santa Regina information

Cook Strait ferries
1984 ships